Unk or UNK may refer to:
Unk (born 1982), American DJ/rapper
UNK NBA, a clothing brand
UNK proton accelerator, a particle accelerator near Moscow
River Unk, Shropshire, river in Shropshire, England
University of Nebraska at Kearney, often abbreviated UNK
Nebraska–Kearney Lopers
Unalakleet Airport (IATA Code UNK), Alaska

See also
 UNC (disambiguation)